Cross Hill is a hamlet and road junction near St Mabyn in Cornwall, England.

References

Hamlets in Cornwall
Transport in Cornwall